Fred Thomas is an American football coach and former player.  He was the seventh and final head coach for the Malone Pioneers in Canton, Ohio from 2015 to 2018.  After the announcement of the conclusion of the football program at Malone, Thomas became an assistant football coach for the Mount Union Purple Raiders in Alliance, Ohio beginning in the 2019 season.  He had previously served as an assistant coach at Malone for the 2015 season.

Coaching history

Assistant coaching and high school
Thomas was the defensive coordinator at Walsh for 16 seasons and worked at Youngstown State from 1978-1986.  He also was a high school head coach at Girard, Alliance, and GlenOak all in Ohio.  He became an assistant coach at Malone for the 2015 season under Eric Hehman.

Malone
When Coach Hehman resigned at Malone, it took the university just over 24 hours to offer the new head coach position to Thomas, something that Malone Athletic Director Charlie Grimes said was an easy move--a decision they said was based in confidence, excitement, respect, and heart.  Thomas took over the program after its first winless year in school history and coached the team during its first season in the Great Midwest Athletic Conference.  As the first season progressed, three teams including Malone had come together to start conference play in 2016 and Malone finished third among the three.

After the conclusion of the 2018 season, Thomas heard the decision to discontinue the program fifteen minutes before having to tell his assistant coaches and players.

Head coaching record

References

Year of birth missing (living people)
Living people
Malone Pioneers football coaches
Mount Union Purple Raiders football coaches
Walsh Cavaliers football coaches
Youngstown State Penguins football coaches
Youngstown State University alumni